Angelo Que (born 3 December 1978) is a Filipino professional golfer.

Que won the Philippine Amateur twice before turning professional in 2003. He has played on the Asian Tour since 2003 and has won thrice: the 2004 Carlsberg Masters Vietnam, the 2008 Philippine Open and the 2010 Worldwide Holdings Selangor Masters.

Amateur wins
2001 Philippine Amateur Championship
2002 Philippine Amateur Championship

Professional wins (16)

Japan Golf Tour wins (1)

Japan Golf Tour playoff record (0–1)

Asian Tour wins (3)

Asian Tour playoff record (1–1)

ASEAN PGA Tour wins (3)

Philippine Golf Tour wins (8)

PGT Asia wins (1)

Playoff record
European Tour playoff record (0–1)

Results in major championships

Note: Que never played in the Masters Tournament or the PGA Championship.

CUT = missed the half-way cut

Team appearances
Amateur
Eisenhower Trophy (representing the Philippines): 1998, 2002
Bonallack Trophy (representing Asia/Pacific): 2000

Professional
Dynasty Cup (representing Asia): 2005 (winners)
World Cup (representing the Philippines): 2008, 2009, 2013, 2016

References

External links

Filipino male golfers
Asian Tour golfers
Japan Golf Tour golfers
Asian Games medalists in golf
Asian Games silver medalists for the Philippines
Golfers at the 1998 Asian Games
Medalists at the 1998 Asian Games
Golfers at the 2002 Asian Games
Sportspeople from Manila
1978 births
Living people